Glasgow Anniesland may refer to:

 Glasgow Anniesland (UK Parliament constituency)
 Glasgow Anniesland (Scottish Parliament constituency)